"The Anacreontic Song", also known by its incipit "To Anacreon in Heaven", was the official song of the Anacreontic Society, an 18th-century gentlemen's club of amateur musicians in London. Composed by John Stafford Smith, the tune was later used by several writers as a setting for their patriotic lyrics. These included two songs by Francis Scott Key, most famously his poem "Defence of Fort McHenry". The combination of Key's poem and Smith's composition became known as "The Star-Spangled Banner", which was adopted as the national anthem of the United States of America in 1931.

The Anacreontic Society

The Anacreontic Society was a gentlemen's club of the kind that was popular in London in the late eighteenth century.  In existence from approximately 1766 to 1792, the Society was dedicated to the ancient Greek poet Anacreon, who was renowned for his drinking songs and odes to love.  Its members, who consisted mainly of wealthy men of high social rank, would meet on Wednesday evenings to combine musical appreciation with eating and drinking.

The Society met twelve times a year.  Each meeting began at half past seven with a lengthy concert, featuring "the best performers in London", who were made honorary members of the Society.

The Society came to an end after the Duchess of Devonshire attended one of its meetings. Because "some of the comic songs [were not] exactly calculated for the entertainment of ladies, the singers were restrained; which displeasing many of the members, they resigned one after another; and a general meeting being called, the society was dissolved". It is not clear exactly when this incident occurred, but in October 1792 it was reported that "The Anacreontic Society meets no more; it has long been struggling with symptoms of internal decay".

The original role of the Song
An early reference to the Anacreontic Song is found in the long-unpublished journals of gentleman-composer John Marsh (1752–1828).  Writing of 11 December 1773, he recalls: 

Another reference is found in the long-unpublished Recollections of  Richard John Samuel Stevens (1757–1837).  In this passage, Stevens is speaking of the year 1777:

Parke, writing in the early nineteenth century, recalls: 

The Anacreontic Song served as the "constitutional song" of the Society.  After the initial concert and meal, the Song would be sung in order to open the after-supper, more light-hearted part of proceedings.  The verses, which are difficult to sing because of their wide range, would be sung by a solo singer, with the entire Society joining in the refrain.  Although it is often described as a "drinking song", Lichtenwanger states that "To Anacreon in Heaven" "was not a barroom ballad, a drinking ditty to be chorused with glasses swung in rhythm", but "convivial, ... in a special and stately way".

Composition and authorship

Words
Early publications of the song ascribe its lyrics to the Society's president, Ralph Tomlinson. Tomlinson was baptized in Plemstall, Cheshire, in 1744; by 1766 he was a lawyer working in London. Tomlinson likely became president of the Society following the death of the previous president, George Bellas, in January 1776.  He died in March 1778 at the age of thirty-three.

Music

While many early publications of the Song attribute the words to Tomlinson, none name the creator of the music.  The identity of the composer was a subject of controversy until the discovery, in the mid-twentieth century, of a passage in a then-unpublished manuscript of Recollections written by Richard John Samuel Stevens (1757–1837), a member of the Anacreontic Society.  Writing of the year 1777, Stevens recalled:

In this passage, Stevens identified the composer as John Stafford Smith (1750–1836).  Smith, the son of the organist of Gloucester Cathedral, was sent at a young age to sing in the Chapel Royal, and thereafter soon established himself in the capital.  Like Stevens himself, Smith was a young professional musician active primarily in the chapels and churches of London.  Smith was a published composer by 1772, subsequently winning two composition prizes from the London Catch Club in 1773.  Both Smith and Stevens were likely among the "honorary members" of the Anacreontic Society who played in its concerts without having to pay the subscription fee;  Smith is probably the "leader" identified by Marsh in his recollection of 1773 excerpted above.

Smith outlived both Ralph Tomlinson and the Anacreontic Society by several decades before dying in 1836.  During his lifetime, the melody of the Song was set to other texts (most notably the "Defence of Fort McHenry" as discussed below) and became extremely popular.  Despite this, Smith does not seem to have been eager to publicize the fact that he had composed the Song.  The best evidence we have for a claim of authorship occurs in his Fifth Book of Canzonets (1799), which included an arrangement of the Anacreontic Song with the ambiguous notation "harmonized by the Author".

It remains puzzling why Smith did not make more effort to associate himself with the Song.  Until the discovery of Stevens's Recollections, there  was some controversy over whether Smith was in fact the composer.  However, no alternative story for the music's origins (whether as the work of a different composer or as a pre-existing tune) ever gained a consensus among historians.  Lichtenwanger suggests that "[p]erhaps Smith composed the song for Tomlinson for money, for a flat fee, which meant yielding his legal rights in it to Tomlinson or the Society".

Date
The date of the composition of the Song is uncertain.  It cannot predate the foundation of the Anacreontic Society (around 1766).  Lichtenwanger suggests a composition date as late as 1776; but if the Marsh journal is accurate then the Song must have existed by December 1773.  The age of John Stafford Smith may also be of interest;  Smith was in his mid-teens in 1766, while by 1773 he was in his early twenties and a published, prize-winning composer.

Publication

The lyrics of the song were published in The Vocal Magazine, 1778, attributed to "Ralph Tomlinson, Esq.".  The music, along with the words, was published in The Vocal Enchantress, a collection published in 1783.  There are also various undated publications of the music which likely date to the early 1780s.  None of these publications name the composer of the music.

Particular interest attaches to the first Longman & Broderip edition of the music, published between 1777 and 1781.  This was likely the first publication of the music and the official edition from which others were copied.  Broderip, a partner at the firm, is known to have attended meetings of the Society.

Lyrics 
The lyrics are "a good-natured takeoff on a bit of pseudoclassical mythology". The following is taken from the first Longman and Broderip edition:

1
To  in Heav'n, where he sat in full Glee,
A few Sons of Harmony sent a Petition,
That he their Inspirer and Patron would be;
When this answer arriv'd from the 
"Voice, Fiddle, and Flute,
"no longer be mute,
"I'll lend you my Name and inspire you to boot,
"And, besides I'll instruct you, like me, to 
2
The news through  immediately flew;
When  pretended to give himself Airs.
"The Devil a Goddess will stay above Stairs.
"Hark! already they cry,
"In transports of Joy,
"Away to the Sons of  we'll fly,
"And there, with good Fellows, we'll learn to 
3
"The  and his nine fusty Maids,
"From 's banks will incontinent flee,
" will boast but of tenantless Shades,
"And the bi-forked Hill a mere  will be
"My Thunder no fear on't,
"Shall soon do  Errand,
"And dam'me! I'll swinge the Ringleaders, I warrant.
"I'll trim the young Dogs, for thus daring to twine
4
 rose up, and said, "Pry'thee ne'er quarrel,
"Good King of the Gods, with my Vot'ries below:
"Your Thunder is useless"—then  his Laurel,
Cry'd "Sic evitabile fulmen, you know!
"Then over each head
"My Laurels I'll spread;
"So my Sons from your Crackers no Mischief shall dread,
"Whilst snug in their Club-Room, they jovially twine
5
Next  got up with his risible Phiz,
And swore with  he'd  join—
"The full Tide of Harmony still shall be his,
"But the Song, and the Catch, and the Laugh shall be mine.
"Then, be not jealous
"Of these honest fellows."
Cry'd , "We relent, since the Truth you now tell us;
6
Preserve Unanimity, Friendship, and Love!
'Tis  to support what's so happily plann'd;
While thus we agree,
Our Toast let it be.
May our Club flourish happy, united, and free!
And long may the Sons of  

The earlier version of the lyrics
In the first known version of the lyrics, as published in The Vocal magazine of 1778, there are two significant textual discrepancies from later publications.

 In the second verse, A fig for Parnassus! To Rowley's we'll fly; appears in place of Away to the Sons of Anacreon we'll fly
 In the third verse, To the hill of old Lud will incontinent flee, appears in place of From Helicon's banks will incontinent flee,

The two replaced lines refer to the Society's earlier meeting-place at the London Coffee-House, which was situated on Ludgate Hill and seems to have occupied the same premises as Rowley and Leech, a wine merchant.

Music
The following melody is taken from the first Longman & Broderip edition:

Subsequent history

The song, through its bawdy lyrics, gained popularity in London and elsewhere beyond the Anacreontic Society. New lyrics were also fashioned for it, including several patriotic titles in the United States. The most popular of these at the time was Robert Treat Paine Jr.'s "Adams and Liberty" (1798).

"The Star-Spangled Banner"

Francis Scott Key wrote "Defence of Fort McHenry" during the War of 1812, while detained on a British ship during the night of 13 September 1814, as the British forces bombarded the American fort. Key specifically wrote the lyrics with this familiar patriotic tune in mind, just as he had done with an earlier set of his lyrics, "When the Warrior Returns", in which he had made similar use of "star-spangled banner" imagery in praise of Stephen Decatur. Later retitled "The Star-Spangled Banner", Key's lyrics, set to Stafford Smith's music, became a well-known and recognized patriotic song throughout the United States, and was officially designated as the U.S. national anthem on 3 March 1931. The setting of new lyrics to an existing tune is called a contrafactum.

References

Bibliography
  PDF link.

External links

Lyrics

"The Star-Spangled Banner"
 UVa Library: Exhibits: Lift Every Voice: Patriotic Odes

Media
 Soundfile (.mp3), John Townley on The Top Hits Of 1776
 , performed by the Georgia Tech Glee Club

18th-century songs
Drinking songs
The Star-Spangled Banner